Johannes Christianus Roedig (1750 – 1802), was an 18th-century painter from the Northern Netherlands.

Biography
He was born in The Hague and became a pupil of Dirk van der Aa. He taught the painters Elisabeth Georgine Hogenhuizen and Abraham Teixeira de Mattos. He was a follower of the flower painter Jan van Huijsum.
He died in The Hague.

References

Johannes Christianus Roedig on Artnet

1750 births
1802 deaths
18th-century Dutch painters
18th-century Dutch male artists
Dutch male painters
Artists from The Hague
Dutch still life painters